Mexico's Protected Nature Sanctuaries (or Santuarios in Spanish) are 17 federally recognized protected areas in Mexico that are administrated by the federal National Commission of Protected Natural Areas (Comisión Nacional de Áreas Naturales Protegidas, or CONANP).

They are areas established in zones characterized by a considerable risk to the flora or fauna, or by the presence of sensitive natural habitats or species. These can include gorges, fertile valleys, caverns, grottos, natural wells, creeks, and other topographic entities that require preservation or protection .

List of Nature Sanctuaries
The 17 areas include 16 beaches (playas) and 1 island group:

 Islas e Islotes de Bahía de Chamela (The islands of Isla La Pajarera, Isla Cocinas, Isla Mamut, Isla Colorada, Isla San Pedro, Isla San Agustín, Isla San Andrés, and Isla Negrita, and the islets Los Anegados, Novillas, Mosca y Submarino)
 Puerto Arista in Chiapas
 Playa de Tierra Colorada in Guerrero
 Playa Piedra de Tlacoyunque in Guerrero
 Playa Cuitzmala in Jalisco
 Playa de Mismaloya in Jalisco
 Playa el Tecuan in Jalisco
 Playa Teopa in Jalisco
 Playa de Maruata y Colola in Michoacán
 Playa Mexiquillo in Michoacán
 Playa de Escobilla in Oaxaca
 Playa de la Bahía de Chacahua in Oaxaca
 Playa de la Isla Contoy in Quintana Roo
 Playa Ceuta in Sinaloa
 Playa el Verde Camacho in Sinaloa
 Playa de Rancho Nuevo in Tamaulipas
 Playa Adyacente (to the region known as Río Lagartos) in Yucatán

Geography of Mexico
Protected areas of Mexico